The 1978 Coppa Italia Final was the final of the 1977–78 Coppa Italia. The match was played on 8 June 1978 between Internazionale and Napoli. Internazionale won 2–1.

Match

References 
Coppa Italia 1977/78 statistics at rsssf.com
 https://www.calcio.com/calendario/ita-coppa-italia-1977-1978-finale/2/
 https://www.worldfootball.net/schedule/ita-coppa-italia-1977-1978-finale/2/

Coppa Italia Finals
Coppa Italia Final 1978
Coppa Italia Final 1978